Project Fear is a science fiction movie made by some youngsters in Vadodara City of Gujarat, India. The complete title of the movie is Reason for Existence Project Fear. The story touches the existentialism very hazily. A boy named Ashish sees his father being murdered in his recurrent dreams. He is unable to answer the reason of the grisly images playing in his mind. Facing the nervous breakdowns, his diurnal activities begin to look like a drag. As the mystery unfolds, he finds out that he was constantly kept under surveillance by superior beings looking for the answer for Reason for Existence.

This film was screened in Baroda Film Club and became popular in the Vadodara city as "Zero Budget Movie". The movie received many positive responses. Newspapers such as Times of India provided extensive coverage to this movie calling it a "Fantastic Sci-fi flick on a Shoe String Budget".

Sources 
 Times of India News Paper
 Gujarat Samachar News Paper
 Sandesh News Paper
 Divya Bhaskar (Vadodara)

Indian science fiction films